Red Otter Creek is a  long 2nd order tributary to the Niobrara River in Knox County, Nebraska.  This is the only stream of this name in the United States.

Variant names
According to the Geographic Names Information System, it has also been known historically as:
Squaw Creek

Course
Red Otter Creek rises on the North Branch Verdigre Creek and East Branch Louse Creek divides about 8 miles north of Star, Nebraska in Holt County and then flows generally northeast into Knox County and to join the Niobrara River about 4 miles northwest of Pishelville, Nebraska.

Watershed
Red Otter Creek drains  of area, receives about 24.8 in/year of precipitation, has a wetness index of 518.81, and is about 3.19% forested.

See also

List of rivers of Nebraska

References

Rivers of Holt County, Nebraska
Rivers of Knox County, Nebraska
Rivers of Nebraska